Brian Hamilton (born 5 August 1967) is a Scottish retired footballer, who played for both Hibernian and Heart of Midlothian as a midfielder. He was part of the Hibernian side that won the 1991 Scottish League Cup Final, and part of the St Mirren side that won the 1987 Scottish Cup Final.

References

External links

London Hearts profile

1967 births
Living people
Footballers from Paisley, Renfrewshire
Scottish footballers
Scottish expatriate footballers
Expatriate soccer players in Australia
Scottish Football League players
National Soccer League (Australia) players
Ayr United F.C. players
Canberra Cosmos FC players
Clydebank F.C. (1965) players
Falkirk F.C. players
Heart of Midlothian F.C. players
Hibernian F.C. players
Partick Thistle F.C. players
St Mirren F.C. players
Stranraer F.C. players
Scotland under-21 international footballers
Association football midfielders
Scottish expatriate sportspeople in Australia